Kevin Zucker may refer to:
 Kevin Zucker (artist)
 Kevin Zucker (game designer)